Banco del Libro is a non-profit organization for the promotion of children's literature, with headquarters in Caracas, Venezuela. It was established in 1960 as a centre for the exchange of textbooks – hence the name Banco del Libro (Book Bank). As it has grown it has diversified to promote reading in Venezuela, in every conceivable arena and genre of children’s literature.

In 2007 Banco del Libro won the biggest prize in children's literature, the Astrid Lindgren Memorial Award from the Swedish Arts Council, recognising its "long-term sustainable work" as a promoter of reading. It is one of two institutions to win the award (2003 to 2012).

Awards 
 Reading Promotion Award, IBBY, 1988
 Guust van Wesemael Prize, IFLA, 2003
 Astrid Lindgren Memorial Award, 2007

References

External links

 

Caracas
Children's literature organizations
Venezuelan literature
Foundations based in Venezuela
Astrid Lindgren Memorial Award winners
Arts organizations established in 1960
1960 establishments in Venezuela